The Soldiers and Sailors Memorial Auditorium is a historic performance hall in Chattanooga, Tennessee.  Built between 1922 and 1924 by John Parks (John Parks Company, General Contractors) at a cost of $700,000 and designed by noted architect R. H. Hunt, who also designed Chattanooga's lavish Tivoli Theatre, the theater honors area veterans of World War I.

The building, located at 399 McCallie Avenue is about halfway between downtown and the UT Chattanooga campus.  It occupies half of the city block bounded by McCallie Avenue, Lindsay Street, Oak Street and Georgia Avenue.

The building contains two theaters; the lower one seats 3,866 and the upper one seats 1,012. There is also a small trade show convention hall in the basement that measures .

By the early 1960s, Memorial Auditorium had fallen into disrepair.  The building was closed in 1965, and reopened after renovations the following year.  It closed again in 1988 for further restoration and modernization.  The repairs cost over $7 million, and Memorial Auditorium reopened in 1991.

In 1975, the auditorium's board of directors found themselves before the United States Supreme Court, as they had been sued by the producers of the musical Hair who were denied permission to stage their show because of its nudity. The case was known as Southeastern Promotions, Ltd. v. Conrad 420 U.S. 546. Justice Harry Blackmun, writing for the court, held that the prohibition on staging the musical was an illegal prior restraint. Also in 1975, Kiss made its first headline-act performance here on September 10 for their then-released Alive! album..

For over 85 years, the venue has hosted religious festivals, political rallies, debutante galas, opera, musicals and concerts.  It continues to be an important cultural attraction for the city, and a key part of its history. In July 2007, the auditorium's historic concert pipe organ, dating to the building's construction, was rededicated after restoration by the Chattanooga Music Club over a period of 21 years.  Efforts are now underway to insure the instrument's continued use and preservation.

Starting in February 2012, renovation began on the smaller community theater located upstairs. It had been closed for over a year primarily due to handicap accessibility issues. All of the seating will be replaced with pews, a concession stand will be added, bathrooms will be overhauled, and finally, accessibility will be improved with adding an elevator to reach the floor where the theater is housed. Completion of the work is expected sometime during 2013. Architect Bob Franklin is leading the design.

External links

 Official Website

Theatres on the National Register of Historic Places in Tennessee
Theatres in Tennessee
Economy of Chattanooga, Tennessee
Buildings and structures in Chattanooga, Tennessee
Tourist attractions in Chattanooga, Tennessee
National Register of Historic Places in Chattanooga, Tennessee
Theatres completed in 1924
1924 establishments in Tennessee